Zachary John Spiker (born September 30, 1976) is an American college basketball coach and the current head basketball coach for the Drexel Dragons. A native of Morgantown, West Virginia, Spiker played college basketball at Ithaca College. He was previously the head coach at Army. He attended The Hill School.

In the 2012–13 season, Spiker lead Army to its first overall winning record since 1984–85 (a drought of 28 years), and also the Black Knights' first ever winning record in the Patriot League. For his efforts, Spiker was named 2012-13 Patriot League Coach of the Year, the first Army head coach in eleven years to win the award.

Spiker has joined Bob Knight and Mike Krzyzewski as the only coaches in Army history to win at least 65 games in their first five seasons.

In 2013–14, the Black Knights set a school record for wins in the Patriot League (10), had only their second season with a winning conference record, and had their first ever back-to-back seasons with winning conference records - all under Spiker.

Finally, under Spiker, Army had its first four-year streak of 15 plus wins (2012–16) since 1920–24.

On March 25, 2016, Spiker was hired as head coach of Drexel to replace former head coach Bruiser Flint. His first year at Drexel concluded with a 9-23 record.

On February 22, 2018, Spiker led Drexel to a 34-point comeback win over Delaware, the largest comeback win in Division 1 history.

Head coaching record

References

External links
 Drexel Dragons profile

1976 births
Living people
American men's basketball coaches
American men's basketball players
Army Black Knights men's basketball coaches
Basketball coaches from West Virginia
Basketball players from West Virginia
College men's basketball head coaches in the United States
Cornell Big Red men's basketball coaches
Drexel Dragons men's basketball coaches
Ithaca Bombers men's basketball players
Place of birth missing (living people)
Sportspeople from Morgantown, West Virginia
The Hill School alumni